There are several names of the Aromanians used throughout the Balkans, both autonyms (like armân) and exonyms (like Vlach).

Aromanian
The names armân/arumân, just as român/rumân (Romanian), derive directly from Latin Romanus ("Roman") through regular sound changes (see Name of Romania). Adding "a" in front of certain words that begin with a consonant is a regular feature of the Aromanian language.

In Greece variants include arumâni and armâni. An older form of "rumân", was still found in the 19th century, in folk songs in Greece. In Albania, the most common form is rămăńi, with occasional forms rumăńi and romăńi.

The form, aromân, used especially by the Aromanians of Romania, is a modern creation, a blend of român (used by the Daco-Romanians) and arumân (used by the Aromanians in Greece). The form "Aromanian", created by analogy with the word "Romanian", was first used by Gustav Weigand in 1894/1895 to replace terms such as "Macedonian Vlachs" or "Macedo-Romanians".

Vlach

Vlachs was a term used in the Medieval Balkans, as an exonym of Germanic origin for all the Romanic people of the region, but nowadays, it is commonly used only for the Aromanians and Megleno-Romanians, the Romanians being named Vlachs only in historical context and in Serbia. Greeks also use the name Kutsovlach ("lame Vlach").

Macedo-Romanian

Macedo-Romanian (macedo-român, derived from "Macedonia" and "Romanian") is a form created by the modern linguists and ethnologists in analogy with the other Balkan Romance languages: Daco-Romanian (or proper Romanian) in Dacia, Istro-Romanian in Istria and Megleno-Romanian in Meglena. Although quite often used, it is a rather improper form, as the Aromanians can be found all across the Balkans, not only in Macedonia.

Macedonian 

One of the traditional names of Aromanians in the geographical region of Macedonia was Macedonians. It is widespread in Romania.

Tsintsar

However, there is also a theory that says that the term is derived from the way the Aromanians say the word 'five': tsintsi, this being according to some from the fifth Roman legion which settled in Balkans at the end of their service. The Albanian variant of this name is "xinxarë" .

Other names

 çoban – "shepherd", a term used by some of the Turks, as well as the Albanians, although Albanians also use "vllah" (derived from "Vlach") and rëmër
 rëmër, "Roman", an Albanian word derived from "Romanus".

References

Bibliography
 Capidan, Theodor (1932) Aromânii. Dialectul aromân, Academia Română.
 Trifon, N. (2005) "The Aromanians, a people on the move".

Aromanians
Aromanians